Numerous episodes of HGTV television shows are filmed in Atlanta, Georgia:

Deserving Design, Atlanta Fire Department fire station #16, aired December 2008
My First Place
"House Poor in Hotlanta" - March 2009-aired episode in Kennesaw (Mountain Oaks and Barrett Knoll)
"The Two-Bedroom Two-Step" (2008) on Belvedere near downtown Atlanta
"Confounded by Condos" - a woman looks for a condo in Brookhaven, Buckhead, or East Atlanta
Curb Appeal shot an episode in or near East Atlanta
Curb Appeal: The Block, which first aired January 2010, shot several episodes in the area, including its debut season in places like Decatur and Smyrna:
"Damaged Driveway Gets an Overhaul", aired on New Year's Day
"The Entire Block Comes Together to Make Over a House and the Street Itself", in the Winnona Park neighborhood of Decatur
House Hunters:
"Post-Katrina Relocation" - a New Orleans real-estate agent who permanently evacuated from Hurricane Katrina finds a home
"Big Dreams, Small Budget"
"From the Big Apple to Atlanta" - the search for a home like his former one in New York
"Moving to Downtown Atlanta" - a woman in Duluth looks for a home in Midtown and Buckhead
"Downsizing in Atlanta"
"Georgia Bound" - a suburban home in Alpharetta
"Downtown Dwellers" (2008) a couple from a suburb near the Atlanta airport look in two new East Atlanta neighborhoods: Parkside Walk and Eastside Walk
a low-rise apartment near Piedmont Park
Designed to Sell:
"Driving Home a Big Sale" (first aired June 2008)
"Green Makeover" (also June 2008)
"Trading Atlanta for Tennessee"
"An Art Gallery Owner Has Outgrown Her Atlanta Condo and Needs to Sell"
My House Is Worth What?:
"Providence, Atlanta, Key Biscayne"
"Cranston, Atlanta, Minneapolis"
"Milwaukee, Bellevue, Atlanta"
"Barrington, Atlanta, New York"
"Denver, Atlanta, Key Biscayne"

References

HGTV
HGTV